Santo Domingo, officially the Municipality of Santo Domingo, ,  is a 4th class municipality in the province of Albay, Philippines. According to the 2020 census, it has a population of 37,765 people.

History

Santo Domingo was a former barrio of Ibalon, then the Municipality of Albay, now Legazpi City. It became a separate Municipality in 1749 through the uproar of its inhabitants and under the leadership of Diego Castellanos who took the matter first to the authorities in Manila, and to the Bishop of Ambos Camarines. But it was not until 1785, 36 years after its establishment as a town that a church was built. In those days, it was only church building that represented the town. The first church was made of wood and basag (bamboo split). Here, the statue of the patron saint Santo Domingo (Saint Dominic de Guzman), whose feast is observed every August 4, was placed. When the church was burned in 1882, the Spanish priests built a new one; the present artistic church with piedras ladradas chiseled balustrades and twin domes.

The town of Santo Domingo was originally named Libog. Albay historians say that there were a number of stories on the origin of the name Libog. One version is that libog was derived from the Bikol word labog meaning "unclear water" for there was a time when no potable water was available in the locality. Another has it that the town might have been called after labog (jellyfish), which abound in its coastal water. Libod (behind) is another version because the town's position is behind the straight road from Legazpi to Tabaco across Basud to Santa Misericordia.

Still another version is the corrupted form of the word libot which means "round about" or "winding way". In the early days of Spanish invasion, there were two routes passing through this place to Tabaco: one trail was straight or a short cut and the other was a round about (libot) way passing through the center of the town (via Poblacion). Later when the time came to classify and arrange this settlement to give it a political status as a visita of Binanuahan, now Legazpi Port, the corruption crept in – Libog for Libot. Hence, this town was named El Pueblo de Liboug, by the Spanish conquerors.

In 1816, one hundred fifty-nine (159 Moro pirates and six (6) vintas attacked the town, taking them one captive, Juan de la Conception, who was able to return after 30 years. The attack prompted the people to construct watchtowers and walls along the shores, which served as their shelter from attacks. Ruins of there walls are still existent.

In the year 1832, the town received its pioneer Filipino priest, father Martin Martinez. The same year,  the Presidencia Municipal was completed under Captain Teodoro Felebrico. This building was ruined and rehabilitated into a public school building in 1918.

On 21 June 1959, Libog was renamed into Santo Domingo, through Republic Act 2520.

Geography

According to the Philippine Statistics Authority, the municipality has a land area of  constituting  of the  total area of Albay.

Barangays
Santo Domingo is politically subdivided into 23 barangays.

Climate

Demographics

In the 2020 census, Santo Domingo had a population of 37,765.

Economy

Tourism

Potenciano Gregorio, Sr., a famous Bicolano composer and musician was born in the town on May 19, 1880. A shrine where his remains are kept is located in the Town Plaza.

Sarung Banggi Festival, an eight-day summer festivity immortalizing Potenciano Gregorio, Sr.'s timeless composition is held here annually in the month of May.

Resorts along the Santo Domingo coastline offer a wonderful view of the black beach, Albay Gulf and a part of the Legazpi City area. Some resorts offer entertainment facilities like videoke and billiards. Some have private pools.

Spanish galleon wreck site which serves as a strong reminder of the rich Manila to Acapulco (Mexico) trade routes during the Spanish era. Found along the shores of Buhatan beach at Santo Domingo, this galleon relic was wrought by a strong typhoon on its way to Acapulco and crushed on the reefs of Albay Gulf. This historical remains lie at five fathoms (9 m) under the sea. It is an ideal place for scuba diving, fishing or boating.

References

External links
 [ Philippine Standard Geographic Code]
 DILG Regional Office No. 5 (Bicol Region) 

Municipalities of Albay